Virpur railway station  is a railway station serving in Rajkot district of Gujarat State of India. It is under Bhavnagar railway division of Western Railway Zone of Indian Railways. Passenger, Express trains halt here.

Virpur is well known for Jalaram Bapa Temple.

Major trains 

Following major trains halt at Virpur railway station in both direction:

 19571/52 Rajkot–Porbandar Express
 19251/52 Somnath–Okha Express
 22957/58 Somnath Superfast Express
 19119/20 Ahmedabad–Somnath Intercity Express
 19569/70 Rajkot–Veraval Express
 11463/64 Somnath–Jabalpur Express (via Itarsi)
 11465/66 Somnath–Jabalpur Express (via Bina)

References

Railway stations in Rajkot district
Bhavnagar railway division